Rita Corday (born Jeanne Paule Teipo-Ite-Marma Croset; October 20, 1920 – November 23, 1992) was an American actress. She appeared in 30 films during the 1940s and 1950s. She was sometimes billed as Paula Corday or Paule Croset.

Biography
Rita Corday was born Jeanne Paule Teipo-Ite-Marma Croset in Tahiti, where her Swiss parents were diplomats. She received theatrical training in Switzerland, Paris and Shanghai.

In 1942, RKO Pictures signed Corday to a long-term contract. She made her first film appearance in January 1943, in Hitler's Children. During her career in Hollywood, she appeared mostly in second features. In her later films she was billed as Paula Corday or Paule Croset.

Personal life
In 1943, Corday announced her engagement to Navy Ensign Marshall Buell. She married producer Harold Nebenzal (1922-2019) in 1947, and retired to raise a family.

Corday died November 21, 1992, after surgery, from complications of diabetes. She is interred at Forest Lawn Memorial Park in Hollywood Hills, California.

Partial filmography

Notes

References

External links

1920 births
1992 deaths
American film actresses
People from Tahiti
Burials at Forest Lawn Memorial Park (Hollywood Hills)
20th-century American actresses
Tahitian women
Swiss emigrants to the United States